The 2011 Rugby League Four Nations tournament (also known as the 2011 Gillette Rugby League Four Nations due to sponsorship by Gillette) was the third staging of the Rugby League Four Nations tournament and was played in England and Wales during October and November 2011, which was contested by regular contestants Australia, England and New Zealand, in addition to Wales, who had qualified for their first Four Nations by winning the 2010 European Cup. The tournament saw the return of international rugby league to London's Wembley Stadium for the first time since 1997, with a double-header played on 5 November 2011. Australia won the tournament, defeating England in the final at Elland Road, Leeds, on 19 November 2011. The match was the last of the 17-year professional career of Australia's captain Darren Lockyer.

History
The 2011 tournament was the third of three Four Nations series planned before the 2013 Rugby League World Cup, with the venues rotating between Europe and the South Pacific. There was no Four Nations in 2012 due to teams preparing for the World Cup.

In addition to automatic inclusions Australia, England and New Zealand, Wales qualified for the tournament by defeating France in the final of the 2010 European Cup.

Referees
 Phil Bentham
 Matt Cecchin
 Henry Perenara

Touch judges/Video Referees
 Paul Holland (TJ)
 Shane Rehm (TJ)
 James Child (TJ)
 Ian Smith (VR)
 Ben Thaler (VR)

Qualifying nations

Squads

Australia
Australian coach Tim Sheens' touring squad was announced on 3 October: Of the twenty four players, twenty three were Australian born while one was Fijian born.

1 Replaced originally selected Brett Stewart who withdrew due to injury.

2 Replaced originally selected David Taylor who withdrew due to injury.

3 Replaced originally selected Glenn Stewart who withdrew for compassionate reasons.

England
The England squad for the 2011 Four Nations: Of the twenty four players, twenty two were English born while one was New Zealand born and one Australian born.

Coach:  Steve McNamara

New Zealand
The Kiwis announced their 23-man touring squad on 4 October. Of the twenty three players, eighteen were New Zealand born while four were Australian born and one Tongan born.

Coach:  Stephen Kearney

1 Replaced original replacement Krisnan Inu who withdrew for family reasons. He replaced originally selected Steve Matai who withdrew due to injury.

2 Replaced originally selected Manu Vatuvei who withdrew due to injury.

3 Replaced originally selected Shaun Johnson who withdrew due to injury.

Wales
The Welsh training squad was named on 14 September. Of the twenty three players, nine were English born while eight were Welsh born and five Australian borns and one South African born.

Coach:  Iestyn Harris

Gareth Thomas was originally selected in the squad, but retired with immediate effect in the week leading up to the tournament.

Venues 
The games were played at venues in England and Wales. The tournament final was played in Leeds.

Results

Round 1

Round 2

Round 3

Standings

Final

Statistics

Top pointscorers

Johnathan Thurston broke the record for most points in a single tournament with his 56-point haul. The previous record of 42 was set in 2005 by New Zealand's Stacey Jones.

Pre-tournament matches
Before the series, England played a Test match against France, New Zealand and Australia played a test in Newcastle before heading to Great Britain, and Wales played Ireland in Neath.

New Zealand were originally scheduled to play a Test match against the Cook Islands on 7 October, however this was called off due to the unavailability of 29 frontline players.

Australia vs New Zealand

France vs England

Wales vs Ireland

References

External links

Rugby League Four Nations
Four Nations
Rugby League Four Nations
Rugby League Four Nations
Four
Four
International rugby league competitions hosted by the United Kingdom